Matteo Pontarollo (born 1974) is an Italian slalom canoeist who competed from the early 1990s to the late 2000s.

He won two silver medals in the K1 team event at the ICF Canoe Slalom World Championships, earning them in 2002 and 2005. He also won a gold medal in the same event at the 2000 European Championships in Mezzana.

World Cup individual podiums

References

Italian male canoeists
Living people
1974 births
Medalists at the ICF Canoe Slalom World Championships
21st-century Italian people